"She Deserves You" is a song written by Kathie Baillie, Michael Bonagura and Don Schlitz, and recorded by American country music group Baillie & the Boys.  It was released in February 1989 as the second single from the album Turn the Tide.  The song reached #8 on the Billboard Hot Country Singles & Tracks chart.

Chart performance

Year-end charts

References

1989 singles
Baillie & the Boys songs
Songs written by Don Schlitz
Song recordings produced by Kyle Lehning
RCA Records singles
Songs written by Michael Bonagura
1989 songs